The player listings are published the Veracruz 2014 website.

Although the competition is considered to be an under-21 age group competition, up to three players born before 1 January 1993 may be named in the squad.

Players marked in boldface have been capped at full international level.

Group A

Mexico
Head Coach:  Raúl Gutiérrez

Honduras
Head Coach:  Jorge Jiménez

Jamaica
Head coach: Theodore Whitmore

El Salvador
Head Coach:  Mauricio Alfaro

Group B

Costa Rica
Head Coach:  Paulo Wanchope

Haiti
Head coach:  Jérôme Velfert

Venezuela
Head coach: Miguel Echenausi

Cuba

References

Men
2014